Asit Krishna Mukherji (1898–March 21, 1977) was a Bengali from Naryanganj, East Bengal with Nazi convictions who published pro-Axis journals.  He married Savitri Devi in 1940 in order to protect her from deportation or internment.

Biography
Asit Krishna attended the University of London taking a doctorate in history.  After graduating, he traveled in the Soviet Union.  Unimpressed with Marxist materialism, he turned down several offers to work for communist newspapers back in India.  He began, instead, to publish The New Mercury in collaboration with Sri Vinaya Datta.  Openly proclaiming its support for Nazi Germany and Aryan racism, it expressed admiration for the race laws and Hellenic ideals. In January 1938, Asit Krishna met Savitri Devi who was deeply impressed with his knowledge of Nazism.  They married on June 9, 1940, in Calcutta.

After The New Mercury was closed down by the British government, he began publishing The Eastern Economist in collaboration with the Japanese legation from 1938 to 1941.

Asit Krishna used his connections with Subhas Chandra Bose and the Japanese authorities to put them in contact with one another, thus facilitating the formation of the Indian National Army.

After the war he made his living as a fortune telling astrologer and had Savitri's books printed.

Works
 A History of Japan, 1945

References
 Hitler’s Priestess: Savitri Devi, the Hindu-Aryan Myth, and Neo-Nazism by Nicholas Goodrick-Clarke, 1998,

External links
 1949: Prophetess of the Saucers from the UFO ROUNDUP Volume 7 Number 39
 Shinto - The Way of the Gods by Savitri Devi (portions of which may have first appeared in The Eastern Economist)

1898 births
1977 deaths
Alumni of the University of London
Bengali activists
Bengali mass media people
Indian astrologers
20th-century astrologers
Indian fascists
Indian publishers (people)
Nazis from outside Germany